Lewis Small (born 26 January 1995) is a Scottish footballer who plays for Camelon. Small was a product of the Falkirk academy system, graduating to the first team in 2012–13 Season.

Club career

Small came through the academy system of his local senior club Falkirk, making his first team debut against Cowdenbeath at Central Park as a substitute for Andy Haworth in the 68th minute. His first senior goal followed in November with the winner deep in injury time against Hamilton Academical. Small has struggled with a shoulder injury over the last couple of years.

On 5 December 2014, Small signed on loan for Stilring Albion on loan until January 2015. Small then signed on a short-term loan deal with Scottish League One side Stenhousemuir in October 2015, scoring on his debut in a two all draw with Cowdenbeath.

Career statistics

References

External links
 

1995 births
Living people
Scottish Football League players
Falkirk F.C. players
Stirling Albion F.C. players
Stenhousemuir F.C. players
Linlithgow Rose F.C. players
Footballers from Falkirk
Scottish footballers
Scottish Professional Football League players
Association football forwards
Footballers from West Lothian
People from Linlithgow